Quercus × saulii  is a hybrid oak tree in the genus Quercus. The tree is a hybrid of Quercus montana (chestnut oak) and Quercus alba (white oak).

References 

saulii
Hybrid plants